The Women's parallel giant slalom competition at the FIS Alpine World Ski Championships 2021 was held on 16 February 2021.

Qualification
The qualification was started at 09:00.

Elimination round

References

 

Women's parallel giant slalom